Drama (드라마) is an album by South Korean singer Jang Minho. It was released on January 2, 2017, by Korean record label Elijah Entertainment. The album is trot oriented, allowing many different tempos and styles.

Background 
It is Jang's first full-length album as a trot singer since his trot debut in 2011. It features the song "Drama". The album includes his hit song "The Man Says" which was released previously and included in the same title single album.

Rediscovered 
Jang has performed the song "You Know My Name" at the popular TV show Romantic Call Centre where he stars every week as a regular cast since 2020. The song entered the chart three years after the album was released. One of this song's YouTube videos is gaining 1.5 million views. The 42nd episode of Romantic Call Centre, which he performed the song "You Know My Name" for the second time, soared to 13.9% nationwide and 15.7% per minute based on Nielsen Korea. "Yeol-li-ji was sung by fellow trot singer Lee Chan-won at the same TV show in 2021, and the song's YouTube video recorded 2 million views in 25 days. "Man vs. Man" has also received new attention in four years since its release, with YouTube's integrated view count exceeding 1 million. The 44th episode of Romantic Call Centre, where "Man vs. Man" was performed, rose to 12.1% nationwide and 13.0% per minute based on Nielsen Korea.

Track listing

Credits and personnel 
Personnel as listed in the album's liner notes are:

Full Album 

 Performed by Jang Minho 
 Composed by Jang Minho, Ma Gyeongsik, Jeong Dongjin, Sul Woon Do, Kim Geundong, Yoo Jongwoon, Yang Joo, Park Minho, Kim Honam, Han Jeongmin
 Written by Jang Minho, Ma Gyeongsik, Yoon Myungsun, Jeong Dongjin, Sul Woon Do, Lee Yong-gu, Park Minho, Kim Gil-rae, Yoo Sootae, Han Jungmin
 Arranged by Oh Seung-eun, Yang Joo, Kim Geundong, Park Gwangbok, Yoo Jongwoon, Park Minho, Lee Seungsoo, Jeong Jaewon
 Drum: Kang Sooho, Kwak Eunhae
 Bass: Lee Seungsoo, Park Minho, Shin Hyungwon
 Guitar: Kwon Tae-kwon, Park Gwangmin, Choi Soon, Ham Choonho, Lee Seong-ryul, Park Gwangbok
 Piano & Keyboard: Son Joohee, Kim Heasun, Yang Kyungjoo, Park Gwangbok, Jeon Youngho, Kim Geundong
 Trumpet: Yoo Kwanjoong, Kim Dongha 
 Trumbone: Lee Hanjin
 String Arrange: Yang Kyungjoo
 String Jam: Bae Shinhee
 Chorus: Kim Hyuna, Park Chaewon, Do Yoonsook
 Sohaegeum: Park Sungjin
 Daegeum: Han Choong-eun

Production and design

 Executive Produced by Shin Hoonchul, Kim Taehoon 
 Produced by Shin Hoonchul, Jang Minho 
 Supervised by Don Kim
 Management: Cho Yoonchul, Lee Chanhyung

 Marketing Promotion: Elijah Entertainment 
 Mastered by Do Jeonghee
 Hair & Makeup by Kang Ho
 Photo & Design by Hooni Yongi
 Printed by Daeyoung Printing Ltd.

References

External links 

 Drama at Melon
 Drama at Bugs Music

Trot albums
2017 albums
Korean-language albums